The Chengdu Hunters are a Chinese esports team founded in 2018 that compete in the Overwatch League (OWL). The Hunters began playing competitive Overwatch in the 2019 season.

All rostered players during the OWL season (including the playoffs) are included, even if they did not make an appearance.

All-time roster

References

External links 
 Chengdu Hunters roster

 
Chengdu Hunters
Chengdu